Sarbia is a Neotropical genus of firetips in the family Hesperiidae.

Species
Sarbia antias  (C. & R. Felder, 1859) Brazil
Sarbia catomelaena  Mabille & Boullet, 1908 Brazil
Sarbia curitiba  Mielke & Casagrande, 2002 Brazil (Paraná)
Sarbia damippe  Mabille & Boullet, 1908 Brazil (Rio Grande do Sul)
Sarbia oneka  (Hewitson, 1866)  Venezuela
Sarbia pertyi (Plötz, 1879) Brazil
Sarbia soza Evans, 1951 Brazil (Paraná)
Sarbia xanthippe  (Latreille, [1824]) Brazil
S. xanthippe xanthippe  Brazil
S. xanthippe spixii (Plötz, 1879) Brazil

References

External links
images representing Sarbia at Consortium for the Barcode of Life

Hesperiidae
Hesperiidae of South America
Hesperiidae genera
Taxa named by Edward Yerbury Watson